Mount Hampden is a village in Mashonaland West Province, Zimbabwe. It is about eleven miles from the capital, Harare. It was the original destination of the Rhodesian Pioneer Column; however, the Column eventually settled some eleven miles to the south. Mount Hampden was named after English politician John Hampden by the hunter and explorer Frederick Courteney Selous. In 2012, the government of Zimbabwe announced its plans to build a new capital city in Mount Hampden. The new capital will reportedly have a Parliament building, a Presidential palace, the Supreme and High courts, the Reserve bank, posh suburbs, hotels and modern shopping malls. 

Populated places in Mashonaland East Province
Planned capitals
Planned cities